General elections were held in Nicaragua to elect a president and National Congress of Nicaragua on 21 May 1950.

In April, Anastasio Somoza García and Emiliano Chamorro Vargas sat down and signed the Pacto de los Generales, thus laying the basis for a new political coalition. Once the agreement was signed, the Congress formally proceeded to set the date and the procedure of the upcoming election. Sixty deputies to a Constituent Assembly would be elected, with forty seats going to the majority party and seventeen to the minority party, plus three that would include the defeated presidential candidate and the two living, popularly elected ex-presidents (Anastasio Somoza García and Emiliano Chamorro Vargas). "Only the Liberals and the Conservatives could participate because the constitutional procedure for registering new parties would be held in abeyance."

The Conservative leadership at no time threatened to withdraw from the race and the election was held as scheduled on 21 May. The results of the election proved a disaster for the Conservatives, who received less than one-quarter of all the votes and won a bare outright majority only in Granada.

Results

References

Bibliography
Elections in the Americas A Data Handbook Volume 1. North America, Central America, and the Caribbean. Edited by Dieter Nohlen. 2005.
Millett, Richard. Guardians of the dynasty: a history of the U.S. created Guardia Nacional de Nicaragua and the Somoza Family. Maryknoll: Orbis Books. 1977.
Political handbook of the world 1954. New York, 1955. 
Walter, Knut. The regime of Anastasio Somoza, 1936–1956. Chapel Hill: The University of North Carolina. 1993.

Elections in Nicaragua
Nicaragua
1950 in Nicaragua
Presidential elections in Nicaragua
Election and referendum articles with incomplete results